Asian School Girls is a 2014 American action film produced by The Asylum and directed by Lawrence Silverstein. The film stars Minnie Scarlet, Sam Aotaki, Catherine Hyein Kim, Devin Lung and Belle Hengsathorn.

Plot 
Four Asian school girls are drugged and raped by a Los Angeles crime syndicate. When one of them commits suicide, the other three plot their scheme against the syndicate to avenge her death. They take jobs as strippers in order to acquire $5,000 worth of weapons and get closer to their targets and they then go on a murderous revenge rampage.

Cast 
 Sam Aotaki as Hannah
 Catherine Hyein Kim as May
 Minnie Scarlet as Vivian
 Belle Hengsathorn as Suzy
 Andray Jackson as Jack
 Alan Pietruzewski as Bannion
 Andrew Callahan as Wes
 John C. Epperson as Martin
 Kevin Ging as Gary
 Xin Sarith Wuku as Ray
 Lucas Davis as Steve
 Devin Schultz as Wu Hung
 William Thomas Jones as Charles
 Roger Lim as Mr. Kang
 Rich Grosso as Rex
 Jeff Houkal as Rocco

References

External links
 
 

2014 films
2014 action films
2014 independent films
Action films about Asian Americans
American independent films
The Asylum films
American films about revenge
Films set in Los Angeles
Films shot in Los Angeles
Girls with guns films
American rape and revenge films
2010s English-language films
2010s American films